is a passenger railway station in the town of Yorii, Saitama, Japan, operated by the private railway operator Tōbu Railway.

Lines
There are no direct trains to or from Ikebukuro.

Station layout
The station consists of an island platform serving two tracks. The platforms are connected to the station building by a footbridge.

Platforms

Adjacent stations

History

The station opened on 10 July 1925. The name comes from the former Hachigata Castle, the ruins of which remain nearby.

From 17 March 2012, station numbering was introduced on the Tōbu Tōjō Line, with Hachigata Station becoming "TJ-36".

A new station building was opened on 21 March 2015.

Passenger statistics
In fiscal 2019, the station was used by an average of 967 passengers daily.

Surrounding area
 Arakawa River

See also
 List of railway stations in Japan

References

External links

 Tobu station information 

Railway stations in Saitama Prefecture
Stations of Tobu Railway
Tobu Tojo Main Line
Railway stations in Japan opened in 1925
Yorii, Saitama